T. K. S. Natarajan (23 July 1933 – 5 May 2021) was an Indian actor and folk singer. Natarajan debuted as a film actor in the 1954 film Ratha Paasam. Since then, he has acted in more than 500 films. The song 'Ennadi Muniyamma Un Kannula Mai' sung by TKS Natarajan in the music of Shankar–Ganesh in the film 'Vanga Mappillai Vanga popularized him throughout Tamil Nadu.

Early life 
When Natarajan was a boy in TKS drama troupe known as TKS, he acted in many plays in TKS drama troupe. Later, Natarajan was called TKS Natarajan.

Film career 
T. K. S. Natarajan debuted as a film actor in the 1954 film Ratha Paasam. Since then, he has acted in more than 500 films such as Nadodi, Then Kinnam, Needhikku Thalaivanangu, Aadu Puli Attam, Mangala Vaathiyam, Ponnagaram, Pagadai Panirendu, Udaya Geetham.

Singing career 
'Ennadi Muniyamma Un Kannula Mai' sung by TKS Natarajan in the music of Shankar–Ganesh in the film 'Vanga Mappillai Vanga popularized him throughout Tamil Nadu. He had sung the song 'Ennadi Muniyamma' in the movie 'Vathiyar' starring actor Arjun. Its the remake of a song, the original version of which was also sung by TKS Natarajan in 1984.

Death 
He died at his home in Saidapet, Chennai, at 6:30 am on 5 May 2021 at the age of 87.

Filmography

1950s

1960s

1970s

1980s

1990s

2000s

References

External links 
 https://gaana.com/artist/tksnatarajan
 https://www.raaga.com/tamil/singer/TKS.-Natarajan
 https://itunes.apple.com/lu/artist/t-k-s-natarajan/id481662565
 https://www.youtube.com/watch?v=pXypZh5qxw0
 https://www.youtube.com/watch?v=ElfxPdiLnis

1933 births
2021 deaths
Indian actors
Male actors from Chennai
Tamil male actors
Tamil folk singers